Ting Hsiao-ching is a Taiwanese politician. She is currently the Deputy Minister of Culture since 20 May 2016.

Early life
Ting obtained her bachelor's degree in philosophy from National Taiwan University.

See also
 Culture of Taiwan

References

Living people
21st-century Taiwanese politicians
National Taiwan University alumni
Year of birth missing (living people)
Taiwanese Ministers of Culture